Heer is a 1955 Punjabi film directed by Nazir, starring Swaran Lata and Inayat Hussain Bhatti in title roles. The movie is based on the famous Heer Ranjha poetry book, written by Waris Shah in the 18th century about the love story between Heer and her lover Ranjha. It was the first Karachi-based Punjab film.

Cast

Music and soundtrack 

The music is composed by Safdar Hussain with playback singers, Inayat Hussain Bhatti, Munawar Sultana, Imdad Husain and Zubaida Khanum.
"Dhole Diley Da Jani Ajay Nahin Aaya" Sung by Zubaida Khanum, lyrics by Baba Alam Siaposh and music of Safdar Hussain
"Assaan Jaan Kay Meet Lai Akhh Wey" Sung by Zubaida Khanum, lyrics by Baba Alam Siaposh
"Hun Beerrian Nuun Kar Ley Bund Ni, Khulla Chhagga Paan Waliay" Sung by Inayat Hussain Bhatti and others, a Banghra song, lyrics by Hazin Qadri and music by Safdar Hussain
"Sahnun Sajana Dey Milney Di Taang Aei" Sung by Inayat Hussain Bhatti, lyrics by Hazin Qadri
"Akhhaan Millian Gulabi Nainaan Naal Ji" Sung by Zubaida Khanum, lyrics by Hazin Qadri, music by Safdar Hussain

See also 
Heer Ranjha (1932 film)
Heer Sial (1938 film)
Heer Sial (1965 film)

References 

1955 films
Punjabi-language Pakistani films
Pakistani black-and-white films
Pakistani musical films
1950s Punjabi-language films
1955 musical films
Films based on folklore
Heer Ranjha